.bq is designated—but not in use—as the Internet country code top-level domain (ccTLD) for Bonaire, Sint Eustatius and Saba (the Caribbean Netherlands) following the assignment on December 15, 2010, by the ISO 3166 Maintenance Agency of BQ as the ISO 3166-1 alpha-2 to the area. This decision followed the dissolution of the Netherlands Antilles and new status of the Caribbean Netherlands as public bodies of the Netherlands on October 10, 2010.

On 15 December 2010 the ISO 3166-1 code for Bonaire, Sint Eustatius and Saba changed to reflect the BQ codified for the ccTLD.

Previously, the Caribbean Netherlands used the former Netherlands Antilles's ccTLD, .an, which has been phased out in July 2015. As part of the Netherlands proper, .nl also applies. Use of the top level domain is as of July 2015 being considered and an economic evaluation is being performed to that effect.

BQ was chosen as other possible codes had already been allocated.

See also
Internet in the Netherlands Antilles
Internet in the Netherlands
.nl
.an

References

External links
 IANA .bq whois information

Country code top-level domains
Communications in the Dutch Caribbean